Danielle Evans is the name of:
Dani Evans (born 1985), American fashion model
Danielle Valore Evans, American writer

See also
Daniel Evans (disambiguation)